The Las Vegas dace (Rhinichthys deaconi) was a species of cyprinid fish.

It was found only in the Las Vegas Valley in the  United States. It was declared extinct in 1986 by the International Union for Conservation of Nature.

Sources

Rhinichthys
Extinct animals of the United States
Cyprinid fish of North America
Fish described in 1984
Taxonomy articles created by Polbot